The Devil's Cinema: The Untold Story Behind Mark Twitchell's Kill Room (McClelland & Stewart) is a non-fiction book by the journalist and author Steve Lillebuen.  The book is written as a narrative and features real characters and real events.

The book is set in Edmonton, Alberta, Canada, and follows several detectives working on a missing persons case and the intersecting lives of Johnny Altinger and Mark Twitchell, an aspiring filmmaker who is under investigation for luring strangers to his "kill room," which police believe is designed to replicate elements and methods used by fictional serial killer Dexter Morgan.

In May 2013, the book won Best Non-Fiction at the Arthur Ellis Awards.

Background 
Twitchell's arrest and trial attracted substantial media attention since his crimes were inspired by Dexter, the television series. ABC's 20/20, Dateline NBC, CBC's The Fifth Estate, and many newspapers around the world covered the story, from England's The Guardian to Australia's The Age.

Steve Lillebuen had been an Edmonton Journal crime reporter when Twitchell was arrested, leading to a three-year project on writing and researching the book. He also spent a year corresponding with Twitchell after he called the author from prison to volunteer for an interview.

Notable people 
 Mark Twitchell: a young businessman and filmmaker who aspires to be the next George Lucas.
 Johnny Altinger: a pipeline worker who loves computers and motorcycles.
 Gilles Tetreault: a new arrival to the city of Edmonton.
 Mark Anstey: the primary investigator in charge of solving the Altinger disappearance.
 Bill Clark: a detective tasked with interrogating major suspects.

Film adaptation
A film adaptation of the book was acquired by David Permut with Sam Hobkinson (Misha and the Wolves) set to direct.

See also
 The One Who Got Away, a personal account from the original intended target of convicted murderer Mark Twitchell, was written by Gilles Tetreault and published in October 2015.

References

External links 
 The Devil's Cinema at McClelland & Stewart
 The Devil's Cinema at Random House
 Author website

2012 non-fiction books
Non-fiction crime books
Canadian non-fiction books
Crime in Edmonton
McClelland & Stewart books
History of Edmonton